Pasar malam  is an Indonesian and Malay word that literally means "night market" (the word comes from bazaar in Persian). A pasar malam is a street market in Indonesia, Malaysia, Brunei and Singapore that opens in the evening, usually in residential neighbourhoods.

It brings together a collection of stalls that usually sell goods such as snacks, local favourite dishes, fruits, clothes, shoes, toys, balloons, watch and alarm clocks, knick-knacks and ornaments at cheap or at least reasonable prices. Unauthorized copies of DVDs, CDs and computer software are often sold at a pasar malam.

Pasar malam might resemble a night festival or a fairground, where fair games and kiddy rides, like mini carousel or mini train ride may also present. Several quintessential fair snacks like cotton candy, ice cream, hot dogs and grilled sausages are also popular, next to the offerings of traditional local delicacies. A pasar malam often takes place only one to a few days of the week, as the traders rotate around different neighbourhoods on different days of the week. Haggling over prices is a common practice at such markets.

History

In Indonesian archipelago, markets are traditionally held on different days with locations rotating among participating villages. This traditional economic custom is known as Hari Pasaran (lit. "market days") in Javanese. After being further developed, market was established more permanently like it is today. The night market is regarded as the continuation of this non-permanent market culture. Night market are usually held during special occasion or festival, such as Sekaten festival in Java, or held in Ramadhan nights, approximately a week before Lebaran.

Among traditional night markets, one of the earliest and biggest was the annual Lunar New Year night market in Batavia, capital of the Dutch East Indies. Held three days prior to Lunar New Year, this night market began in the late 1820s as an initiative of Tan Eng Goan, the 1st Majoor der Chineezen of Batavia, and became a prototype for similar night markets.

After the discovery of electricity and lightbulb, night markets were held more frequently in colonial Dutch East Indies in early 20th century. The most notable one is Pasar Gambir, a night market fair held in 1906 and yearly from 1921 until the outbreak of World War II in 1942, in the Koningsplein, Batavia, Dutch East Indies (now Merdeka Square, Jakarta, Indonesia) to celebrate the birthday of Queen Wilhelmina of the Netherlands. It has become the predecessor of the annual Jakarta Fair and Den Haag's Tong Tong Fair which are actually a night market and festival held for several weeks.

Indonesia

In Java, especially in the Javanese royal cities Yogyakarta and Surakarta, the grand week-long pasar malam is usually held annually during the Sekaten festival to celebrate Mawlid or the birthday of prophet Muhammad. During colonial Dutch East Indies the annual Pasar Malam was held in Pasar Gambir (today Merdeka square) and become the predecessor of modern Jakarta's annual Jakarta Fair.

Today, several kecamatan (district) in Jakarta and also other provinces in Indonesia, hold weekly pasar malam, usually every Saturday night in a nearby alun-alun square, open fields or marketplaces. In Indonesia, pasar malam has become a weekly recreational place for local families. Other than selling variety of goods and foods, some pasar malam also offer kiddy rides and carnival games, such as mini carousel or mini train ride. In Palembang, a popular pasar malam is located on front of Kuto Besak Fort on the bank of Musi River. This pasar malam sells local dishes and snacks such as pempek, lenggang and tekwan, and also offers souvenirs and handy crafts.

Malaysia

In Malaysia, Pasar Malam are normally setup at temporary closed street for vehicle and open for pedestrian during evening until late night on weekly basis. At certain location due to frequency or few time in a week, narrow and busy street also safety reasons, Pasar Malam will open at Tapak Pasar Malam on nighttime which describe an allocation space that convert a parking space during a daytime.

Due to the hot Malaysian weather during the daytime, the Pasar Malam has become a nightlife activity that attracts local community after working time and tourist crowd to shop with moderate night temperatures looking for cheap hot foods, clothing, groceries, etc. The vendor licenses are obtained from local authorities under the local council area.

Majority of the local vendor selling plenty type of drinks, hot foods and local delicacies from Malay, Malaysian Chinese and Indian background which are famous and also the difficult to find, fresh fruits and vegetables, fresh fish and seafoods, fresh meat and poultry, toys, family range of clothes and accessories. Some local vendor also selling a live pets or even a phone accessories.

Singapore
In Singapore, food hawkers at pasar malams are required to get a licence from local council to ensure health, cleanliness and to control numbers to avoid traffic congestion. Food handlers are required to get a medical checkup and Typhim VI vaccinations. The pasar malam site is allocated by the local council.

The Netherlands

In the Netherlands, a yearly Indo Eurasian festival is held in The Hague under the name Tong Tong Fair, formerly known as the Pasar Malam Besar (besar meaning "big"). Due to the high number of Indo-Eurasians and the successive success of this event since 1959, dozens of pasar malam are held each year in the Netherlands. Recently the Indonesian embassy has started sponsoring a yearly "pasar malam Indonesia", mainly to promote Indonesian business and enhance Dutch-Indonesian relations.

See also
 Bazaar
 Hawker centre, open-air complexes in Malaysia and Singapore housing many stalls that sell a variety of inexpensive food
 Kopi tiam, literally a "coffee shop"
 Market (place)
 Pasar pagi, (morning market)
 Retail
 Wet market
 Farmers' market

References

External links
 MyPasarMalam – Malaysia pasar Malam directory
 Pasar malam business
 Pasar Malam SG

Indonesian culture
Malaysian culture
Singaporean culture
Night markets
Malay words and phrases
Retailing in Indonesia
Retailing in Malaysia